Thailand participated in the 1994 Asian Games in Hiroshima on 2–16 October 1994. Thailand ended the games at 25 overall medals including 3 gold medals.

Nations at the 1994 Asian Games
1994
Asian Games